Chief Inspector Reginald "Reg" Wexford is a recurring character in a series of detective novels by English crime writer Ruth Rendell. He made his first appearance in the author's 1964 debut From Doon With Death, and has since been the protagonist of 23 more novels (plus some short stories). In The Ruth Rendell Mysteries he was played by George Baker.

Character
In a 2013 interview, Rendell stated:
Wexford is a Liberal Democrat though, and I am a Labour party member, in fact a Labour peer, so I am further to the left than him.

Wexford is an intelligent, sensitive man. He has a placid wife, Dora, and two daughters, Sheila and Sylvia. He has a good relationship with Sheila (his favourite) but a difficult relationship with Sylvia (who feels slighted though he has never actually intended to slight her). He also has a strong friendship with DI Mike Burden.

Setting
The Wexford series of novels are set in "Kingsmarkham", a fictional town in Sussex. Kingsmarkham has been reported as "inspired by Midhurst in West Sussex".

Rendell says that Kingsmarkham "is not romantic at all, (with) ugly modern buildings, huge supermarkets, open car lots and bus garages, and sprawling blocks of local authority housing with the police station a concrete box of tricks amid the quiet crowded houses of High Street … a piece of gaudy litter in a pastoral glade and having modern furniture and (a) sleek, gleaming reception counter".

Novels
From Doon with Death (1964)
A New Lease of Death (1967) (known as Sins of the fathers in the US)
Wolf to the Slaughter (1968)
The Best Man to Die (1969)
A Guilty Thing Surprised (1970)
No More Dying Then (1971)
Murder Being Done Once (1972) (known as Murder being once done in the US)
Some Lie And Some Die (1973)
Shake Hands Forever (1975)
A Sleeping Life (1978)
Put on By Cunning (1981) (known as Death notes in the US)
The Speaker of Mandarin (1983)
An Unkindness of Ravens (1985)
The Veiled One (1988)
Kissing the Gunner's Daughter (1992)
Simisola (1994)
Road Rage (1997)
Harm Done (1999)
The Babes in the Wood (2002)
End in Tears (2005)
Not in the Flesh (2007)
The Monster in the Box (2009)
The Vault (2011)
No Man's Nightingale (2013)

References

External links
Inspector Wexford - celebrating the books, and the tv series.

Book series introduced in 1964
Wexford, Reginald
Characters in mystery novel series of the 20th century
Literary characters introduced in 1964
British mystery novels
British detective novels
British novels by series
Crime novel series
Novels by Ruth Rendell
British detective television series